Carey Salerno is an American poet and publisher.

Biography
She was born in Kalamazoo, Michigan, grew up near Lake Michigan, and earned her B.A. from Western Michigan University, and her MFA in creative writing from New England College. 

Her most recent book, Tributary, (Persea Books, 2021)  was reviewed by Poets & Writers, and Los Angeles Review of Books.<ref>[https://dev.lareviewofbooks.org/article/second-acts-a-second-look-at-second-books-of-poetry-pandemic-edition-part-ii/ Los Angeles Review of Books > Second Acts: A Second Look at Second Books of Poetry: Pandemic Edition, Part II By Lisa Russ Spaar  October 12, 2021]</ref> In their review, Publishers Weekly praised Salerno for delivering “a bold, memorable, and capacious collection.” Salerno was also interviewed by Poets & Writers about her writing of the book.
Her first book, Shelter, (Alice James Books, 2008), was the winner of a 2007 Kinereth Gensler Award. Library Journal, in reviewing Shelter, wrote that “This first collection takes courage to read, but you can bet it took more courage to write, and we should be glad Salerno did it.” She has had her poems published in literary journals and magazines including American Poetry Review, New England Review, Alaska Quarterly Review, Rattle (magazine), and From the Fishouse.Salerno is also the executive director of Alice James Books. She has been featured or interviewed as executive director by HuffPost, Poets & Writers, The New York Times, and by the Community of Literary Magazines and Presses, when she accepted the 2021 Golden Colophon Award on behalf of Alice James Books.The New York Times | Arts Beat | Poetry Profiles: Alice James Books by Dana Jennings | March 26, 2014 Lit from Inside: 40 Years of Poetry from Alice James Books, the poetry anthology which she and Anne Marie Macari co-edited, received a starred review from Publishers Weekly.She lives with her husband in New Jersey.Carey Salerno’s Website > About Carey

Published works
 Tributary (Persea Books, 2021)
 Shelter'' (Alice James Books, 2008)

References

External links 
 Author website
 Publishers Weekly | Starred Review | Tributary by Carey Salerno | March 19, 2021
 Poets & Writers | Ten Questions for Carey Salerno | by Staff | 04/20/21
 Audio: From the Fishouse > Carey Salerno Reading Her Poems
 Poem: Connotation Press > Issue IV, Volume II > January 2010 > Carey Salerno: Poetry: Erasing Digital Photos
 Review: Library Journal > Arts & Humanities > January 15, 2009 > Review by Barbara Hoffert of Shelter by Carey Salerno
 Review: Coldfront Magazine > Review by Ken L. Walker of Shelter by Carey Salerno

Living people
Poets from Michigan
Poets from Maine
Western Michigan University alumni
American publishers (people)
People from Farmington, Maine
New England College alumni
American women poets
Year of birth missing (living people)
21st-century American women